The ageing of Europe, also known as the greying of Europe, is a demographic phenomenon in Europe characterised by a decrease in fertility, a decrease in mortality rate, and a higher life expectancy among European populations. Low birth rates and higher life expectancy contribute to the transformation of Europe's population pyramid shape. The most significant change is the transition towards a much older population structure, resulting in a decrease in the proportion of the working age while the number of the retired population increases. The total number of the older population is projected to increase greatly within the coming decades, with rising proportions of the post-war baby-boom generations reaching retirement. This will cause a high burden on the working age population as they provide for the increasing number of the older population. 

Throughout history many states have worked to keep high birth rates in order to have moderate taxes, more economic activity and more troops for their military.

Population ageing is observed in most European countries today.

Overall trends

Giuseppe Carone and Declan Costello of the International Monetary Fund projected in September 2006 that the ratio of retirees to workers in Europe will double to 0.54 by 2050 (from four workers per retiree to two workers per retiree). William H. Frey, an analyst for the Brookings Institution think tank, predicts the median age in Europe will increase from 37.7 years old in 2003 to 52.3 years old by 2050 while the median age of Americans will rise to only 45.4 years old.

Máire Geoghegan-Quinn, the former European Commissioner for Research, Innovation and Science, stated in 2014 that by 2020 a quarter of the population of Europe will be 60 years or older. This shift in demographics will drastically change the economic, labor market, health care, and social security of Europe.

The Organisation for Economic Co-operation and Development estimates 39% of Europeans between the ages of 55 to 65 work.

Austria's Social Affairs Minister said in 2006 that, by 2010, the 55- to 64-year-old age bracket in the European Union would be larger than the 15- to 24-year-old bracket. The Economic Policy Committee and the European Commission issued a report in 2006 estimating the working age population in the EU will decrease by 48 million, a 16% reduction, between 2010 and 2050, while the elderly population will increase by 58 million, a gain of 77%.

In 2002, the U.S. Census Bureau estimates the European Union will experience a 14% decrease in its workforce and a 7% decrease in its consumer populations by 2030.

The feminisation of old age is reflected by an increasing number of females age 65 and older. The longer life span is prevalent amongst women across the world. In Europe the life expectancy for women is 81 years old, while men's life expectancy is only 74 years old, which gives 7 years' difference. Life expectancy at age 60 is four years longer for women in comparison to men. Projections show additional 24 years for females and 20 years for males in Europe.

Causes

Population ageing in Europe is caused primarily by three factors: declining fertility rates, increased life expectancy, and migration. The causes of population ageing vary among countries.

Fertility 

The high number of people aged 60 and older in Europe is the result of high fertility rates which occurred 1950–1960. The period after the end of World War II was characterised by good social and economic status of the population in the child-bearing age and resulted in a "baby boom".

Current low fertility levels also contribute to the ageing of Europe. As the fertility levels drop, the age structure of the population changes, and the number of the younger groups decrease in relation to the older age groups. Europe's fertility rates have been less than the 2.1 children per woman (standard) replacement level and are projected to remain below the replacement level in the future.

Mortality 
People are living longer with projections of average life expectancy reaching 84.6 years for men and 89.1 for women by 2060, an increase of 7.9 years of life for men and 6.6 years of life for women compared to 2010. The longer life span results in the changing age structure in the population by increasing the numbers of people in the older age group. The average life expectancy of the older population will depend on the progress in medicine to prevent the diseases which are the leading causes of death. Among the top three causes of death are ischemic artery disease, stroke and chronic obstructive pulmonary disease.

Migration 
People immigrating and emigrating from the country will cause fluctuations, in particular, in the size of the working age group of the population. If there are high numbers of young immigrants coming to the country it will result in a decrease of the proportion of the ageing population. In the following countries immigration is projected to slow the population ageing: Luxembourg, Switzerland, Norway, Germany, Sweden, Finland, Belgium, Denmark, Austria and United Kingdom. Emigration would cause the opposite effect on population ageing by having people in the working age leaving the country, and accelerating the ageing of the population as a result. Increase of the ageing population caused by emigration is projected to occur in Latvia.

Effects

Populations in Europe react in different ways to demographic changes, depending on what is happening in their countries. Both ageing, emigration and immigration can cause anxiety in populations of individual countries. Demographic studies and resultant reports conducted by the European Commission point to the declining birth rate of the population of the native European peoples, which would need to be reversed from its present level of about 1.4 in order to preclude a population decline of the native European peoples by nearly half in each generation, back to a replacement level of 2.1. Some have claimed that in order to compensate, it is necessary to allow migrants to settle in Europe in order to prevent labour shortages. It has been argued that such immigration leads to ethnic conflicts, such as the 2005 civil unrest in France.

Long-term decreasing rates in fertility and increasing life expectancy could have damaging consequences for almost every European nation. These demographic trends provoked debate over the best policies that can reverse these trends and lessen their consequences. RAND Europe, an independent not-for-profit research institute, was able to collect these policies through research and analysis. There were three broad policy approaches that were generated from the debate. The first policy is to encourage childbearing among younger couples that involves marriage and cohabitation. The second policy states that there should be an increase in the immigration of working-age people. Thirdly, there should be an improvement of social policy in general, to mitigate negative consequences of these trends. The research intends to examine the relationship between demographic trends and European government policies and determine which policies can reduce the consequences of low fertility and population ageing.

Countries

Belgium 

The International Monetary Fund's (IMF) High Council of Finance's (HCF) Study Committee on Ageing (SCA) predicted in 2007 that Belgium's population will increase by 5% by 2050 due to immigration, a higher fertility rate, and longer life expectancy. However, the IMF's study indicates Belgium's elderly population will increase by over 25% to over 63% of the country's overall population.

The Belgian government spent 9.1% of its GDP on pensions and 7.1% on health care expenses in 2005. By 2050 total social spending is expected to increase by 5.8%, assuming there is no change in the age of retirement. Most of this higher social spending comes from pension and health care, rising by 3.9% to 13.0% of GDP and 3.7% to 10.8% of GDP, respectively.

The decline in the workforce will partly compensate by lowering unemployment which will in turn lower the cost of childcare. The IMF also predicts that by 2050 the percentage of Belgian population over the age of 65 will increase from 16% to 25%.

In 2017 24.6% of the population of Belgium was over 60 years old, and it is projected to increase to 32.4% by the year 2050. The life expectancy at birth in 2010–2015 is projected to be 83 years for females and 78 years for males.

Finland

Finland has one of the oldest populations of Europe. The so-called baby boomer generation born between 1945 and 1949 has already retired, and the share of over-65-year-olds of the population will increase from 20 percent in late 2010s to 26 percent by 2030 and to 29 percent by 2060. In comparison to its Nordic neighbours, a low share of Finnish people older than 61 years are still working. The government has aimed to increase their share in work life following the OECD recommendations. The increasing share of old people is predicted to burden the Finnish social welfare and pension system heavily in the following decades, increasing pressure to raise taxes. The collapse in fertility rates from 1.81 to just 1.34 in Finland during 2010s has made the future forecasts even more severe, as the share of working aged population will decrease by hundreds of thousands by 2050s. Also regional distribution of older people is uneven: the peripheric Finnish provinces will have a much higher share of elderly people than growing regions such as Uusimaa and Pirkanmaa.

According to 2019 estimate, the population of Finland will start decreasing by 2031, and in 2050 it will be some 100.000 lower than in 2019, given that migration will remain stable.

France

France overtook Ireland as the European Union member state with the highest birth rate in 2007. Projected birth rates indicate that France will have the largest population in the EU by 2050, with 75 million citizens, overtaking Germany, but only the second largest in Europe, with the UK having a larger estimated population. In 2011, France was the only European Union member with a fertility rate at replacement level, with an average rate of 2.08 children per woman while Ireland's fertility rate declined to 2.01 children per woman, slightly below replacement level. The reason for an increase in children is due to the government family benefits that are provided to these families. They receive an allowance based on income and how many children they have in the household.

The total fertility rate (TFR) fell to 1.99 children per woman in 2013 from 2.01 in 2012 and 2.03 in 2010. A rate of 2.1 children per woman is considered necessary to keep the population growing excluding migration.

For the year 2017 the percentage of population aged 60 or older was 25.7%, and projected to increase to 32.2% by 2050. The life expectancy at birth in 2010–2015 is projected to be 85 years for females and 79 years for males.

Germany

With over 83 million inhabitants in September 2019, Germany is the most populous country in the European Union. However, its fertility rate of 1.596 children per woman in 2020 is very low, and the federal statistics office estimates the population will shrink to between 65 and 70 million by 2060 (65 million assuming a net migration of +100,000 per year; 70 million assuming a net migration of +200,000 per year). With death rates continuously exceeding low-level birth rates, Germany is one of a few countries for which the demographic transition model would require a fifth stage in order to capture its demographic development. In Germany, the population in some regions, especially the former Communist East Germany, is undergoing a current decline and depopulation. The Bauhaus Dessau Foundation came up with comprehensive plans to tear down numerous buildings and replace them with parks in various cities and the government of Germany developed a plan to reduce at great expense the width of sewer pipes in various cities. The southern states, however, have net gain in population and Germany as the economic powerhouse of the EU is attracting immigrants overall.

In 2017 28.0% of the population of Germany was over 60 years old, and it is projected to increase to 37.6% by the year 2050. The life expectancy at birth in 2010–2015 is projected to be 83 years for females and 78 years for males.

Italy

Under current fertility rates, Italy will need to raise its retirement age to 77 or admit 2.2 million immigrants annually to maintain its worker to retiree ratio. About 25% of Italian women do not have children while another 25% only have one child.

The region of Liguria in northwestern Italy now has the highest ratio of elderly to youth in the world. Ten percent of Liguria's schools closed in the first decade of the 21st century. The city of Genoa, one of Italy's largest and the capital of Liguria, is declining faster than most European cities with a death rate of 13.7 deaths per 1,000 people, almost twice the birth rate, 7.7 births per 1,000 people, .

The Italian government has tried to limit and reverse the trend by offering financial incentives to couples who have children, and by increasing immigration. While fertility has remained stagnant, immigration has minimised the drop in the workforce.

In 2017 29.4% of the population of Italy was over 60 years old, and it is projected to increase to 40.3% by the year 2050. The life expectancy at birth in 2010–2015 is projected to be 85 years for females and 80 years for males.

Poland

The economic effects of demographic shifts will be less concerning in Poland than in its neighboring countries even though it is expected to lose 15 percent of its population by mid-century. It is projected that by 2050 population of Poland will decrease to 32 million due to the emigration and low birth rates. The fertility rates have dropped from 3.7 children per woman in 1950 to 1.32 children per woman in 2014. This drastic drop would affect the economy of Poland. 

In an effort to reverse declining birth rates, the Polish government in 2016 introduced a policy of paying 500 zlotys (about US$128) per month to families for every child below the age of 18 after the first child. The policy has since then been extended to the first child as well.

Portugal

Portugal's population census of 1994 found that 13.1% of the population was above the age of 65. Average life expectancy for Portuguese increased by eight years between the 1980s and the first decade of the 21st century. In 2017 the population of the people aged 60 and more was 27.9%, with an estimate to increase in 2050 to 41.7%. The life expectancy at birth in 2010–2015 is projected to be 83 years for females and 77 years for males.

In the 1960s life expectancy for men ranked comparatively low in relation to other Western European nations, with 61.2 years for men and 67.5 years for women. As of 2006, the average for both sexes was at 77.7 years. In 1999 demographers predicted the percentage of elderly Portuguese would increase to 16.2% and 17.6% in 2010.

Recent studies in the newspaper Público showed that the population may shrink to 7.5 million (−29% of the current population, −0.7% of average populational growth per year) in 2050, if the fertility rate continues at 1.45 children per woman; taking into account the almost stationary emigration due to the economic crisis. In 2011, Portugal's fertility rate reached 1.51 children per woman, stemming the decline in the nation's fertility rate, although it is still below replacement level.

Spain

In 1970, Spain's TFR of 2.9 children per woman ranked second in Western Europe after Ireland’s's rate of 3.9. By 1993 Spanish fertility declined to 1.26 children per woman, the second-lowest after Italy.

In 1999, Rocío Fernández-Ballesteros, Juan Díez-Nicolás, and Antonio Ruiz-Torres of Autónoma University in Madrid published a study on Spain's demography, predicting life expectancy of 77.7 for males and 83.8 for females by 2020. Arup Banerji and economist Mukesh Chawla of the World Bank predicted in July 2007 that half of Spain's population will be older than 55 by 2050, giving Spain the highest median age of any nation in the world.

In recent years, Spain's fertility rate has grown from 1.15 children per woman in 2000 to 1.48 in 2011.

In 2017 25.3% of the population of Spain was over 60 years old, and it is projected to increase to 41.9% by the year 2050. The life expectancy at birth in 2010–2015 is projected to be 85 years for females and 79 years for males.

United Kingdom

The UK had a fertility rate of 1.68 in 2018 according to the Office for National Statistics. In 2019, England had a TFR of 1.66, and Wales had a TFR of just 1.54. Scotland's TFR was 1.37 in 2019. In 2017, N.Ireland had a TFR of 1.87. By 2050, it is projected that one in four people in the UK will be aged 65 years and over – an increase from approximately one in five in 2018. According to the ONS' principal projection for the UK from 2019 data, the population is due to rise to over 73.6 million by 2050.

In mid-2019, there were 12.4 million people aged 65 years and over (18.5%) and 2.5% were aged 85 years and over. The proportion aged over 65 is forecast to rise to a quarter by 2050. Life expectancy at birth in the UK in 2020, using the 2017 to 2019 tables to make projections, was 79.4 years for males and 83.1 years for females.

Other regions

Russia

The current Russian total fertility rate is 1.7 children per woman. While this represents an increase over previous rates, it remains sub-replacement fertility, below the replacement rate of 2.10–2.14.

The population of the Russian Federation declined from its peak of 148,689,000 in 1991, to about 143 million people in 2013, a 4% decline. The World Bank predicted in 2005 that the population was set to decrease to 111 million by 2050, a 22% decline, if trends did not improve. The United Nations similarly warned that the population could decline by one third by mid-century.

In 2006 a national programme was developed with a goal to reverse the decline by 2026. A study published shortly after in 2007 showed that the rate of population decrease had slowed: According to the study, deaths exceeded births by 1.3 times, down from 1.5 times in the previous year, thus, if the net decrease in January–August 2006 was 408,200 people, in the same period during 2007 it was 196,600. The decline continued to slow in 2008 with only half the population loss compared to 2007. The reversal continued at the same pace in 2009 as death rates continued to fall, birth rates continued to rise and net migration stayed steady at about 250,000; in 2009 Russia saw population growth for the first time in 15 years.

The improving economy has had a positive impact on the country's low birth-rate, as it rose from its lowest point of 8.27 births per 1000 people in 1999 to 11.28 per 1,000 in 2007. Russian Ministry of Economic Development hopes that by 2020 the population will stabilise at 138–139 million, and that by 2025 it will begin to increase again to its present-day status of 142–145, also raising the life expectancy to 75 years.

The two leading causes of death in Russia are heart disease and stroke, accounting for about 52% of all deaths. While cardiovascular disease-related deaths decreased in Japan, North America, and Western Europe between 1965 and 2001, in Russia CVD deaths increased by 25% for women and 65% for men.

The percentage of infertile, married couples rose to 13% in the first decade of the 21st century, partially due to poorly performed abortions. According to expert Murray Feshbach 10–20% of women who have abortions in Russia are made infertile, though according to the 2002 census, only about 6–7% of women have not had children by the end of their reproductive years.

Mothers who give birth on 12 June, Russia's national day, are rewarded with money and expensive consumer items. In the first round of the competition 311 women participated and 46 babies were born on the following 12 June. Over 500 women participated in the second round in 2006 and 78 gave birth. The province's birth rate rose 4.5% between 2006 and 2007.

Large-scale immigration is suggested as a solution to declining workforces in western nations, but according to the BBC, would be unacceptable to most Russians. Organisations like the World Health Organization and the UN have called on the Russian government to take the problem more seriously, stressing that a number of simple measures such as raising the price of alcohol or forcing people to wear seat belts might make a lasting difference.

Then-President Vladimir Putin said in a state of the nation address that "no sort of immigration will solve Russia's demographic problem". Yevgeny Krasinyev, head of migration studies at the state-run Institute of Social and Economic Population Studies in Moscow, said Russia should only accept immigrants from the Commonwealth of Independent States, a view echoed by Alexander Belyakov, the head of the Duma's Resources Committee.

Migration in Russia grew by 50.2% in 2007, and an additional 2.7% in 2008, helping stem the population decline. Migrants to Russia primarily come from CIS states and are Russians or Russian speakers. Thousands of migrant workers from Ukraine, Moldova, and the rest of the CIS have also entered Russia illegally, working but avoiding taxes. There are an estimated 10 million illegal immigrants from the ex-Soviet states in Russia.

Central Europe and the former Soviet Union 

The World Bank issued a report on 20 June 2007, "From Red To Grey: 'The Third Transition' of Aging Populations in central Europe and the Former Soviet Union", predicting that between 2007 and 2027 the populations of Georgia and Ukraine will decrease by 17% and 24%, respectively. The World Bank estimates the population of 65 or older citizens in Poland and Slovenia will increase from 13% to 21% and 16% to 24%, respectively between 2005 and 2025.

See also

Aging of the United States
Aging of Japan, South Korea, and China
Russian Cross
Demographics of Europe
List of European countries by population growth rate
Political demography
Population decline
Retirement in Europe

General:
List of sovereign states and dependencies by total fertility rate
Population ageing
Population pyramid
Sub-replacement fertility
World population
Replacement migration

Demographic economics:
Dependency ratio
Generational accounting
Pensions crisis

References

Notes

Further reading
Kunisch, Sven; Boehm, Stephan A.; Boppel, Michael (eds): From Grey to Silver: Managing the Demographic Change Successfully, Springer-Verlag, Berlin Heidelberg 2011, 
 Sanchez-Gonzalez, Diego; Rodriguez-Rodriguez, Vicente (eds): Environmental Gerontology in Europe and Latin America. Policies and perspectives on environment and aging. Nueva York: Springer Publishing Company. .
Scholefield, Anthony. The Death of Europe: How Demographic Decline Will Destroy the European Union. 2000.

External links
FLASH POINTS AND TIPPING POINTS: Security Implications of Global Population Changes, 2005–2025
CoViVE Research Consortium on Population Aging in Flanders and Europe
The Emptying of Russia
Replacement Migration: Is it a solution for Russia?
Some EU nations offer benefits for births
European Countries Try to Stimulate Higher Birth Rates
Norway's welfare model 'helps birth rate'
Dossier "The Aging Society" – Goethe-Institut

Ageing
Demographics of Europe
Europe